Emma Karolina Johansson (born 23 September 1983) is a Swedish retired professional racing cyclist. Nicknamed Silver Emma, Johansson accumulated many second and third places at major championships and one-day classics. In 2013 she finished the year as number one on the UCI Women's World Ranking.

She won the silver medal in the women's road race at both the 2008 and 2016 Summer Olympics, as well as one silver and two bronze medals at the Road World championships. She also holds a record four podium finishes at the Tour of Flanders for Women, with one second and three third places. Despite her amassing of podium places, she won several one-day races, including Omloop Het Nieuwsblad, Ronde van Drenthe, Trofeo Alfredo Binda-Comune di Cittiglio, Omloop van het Hageland, Le Samyn and the Holland Hills Classic.

Johansson was also successful in stage races. She won the Thüringen Rundfahrt der Frauen three times, the Emakumeen Euskal Bira twice and the Belgium Tour once. In addition, she won one stage in the 2012 Giro d'Italia Femminile and finished in the top ten in all three of her Giro d'Italia Femminile participations.

Biography

Early life and amateur career
Emma Johansson was born in Sollefteå, in northern Sweden. She engaged in cross-country skiing with the Sollefteå Ski Club at an early age, before taking an interest in mountainbiking through her older brother. She trained on military training fields, close to her house, which offered dirt roads and illuminated trails. She won her first silver medal in 1996, at the age of 12, at the Swedish national mountainbike championships in Uddevalla.

2008
Johansson's breakthrough year was 2008. On 10 August, Johansson won the silver medal in the women's road race at the Beijing Olympics. Cooke won the event in the five-woman sprint, Johansson claimed the silver ahead of Guderzo. Three day later, she placed 21st in the women's time trial.

After the Summer Olympics, she claimed the general classification of the Trophée d'Or Féminin after she won the fifth stage in a six-woman breakaway. At the World Championships Road Race in Florence, Johansson was again in a winning five-woman breakaway after she followed an attack of Marianne Vos. The race, like the Olympic road race, was won by Nicole Cooke, who beat Vos in the sprint. Johansson finished fourth.

2009
After finishing second in the 2009 Trofeo Alfredo Binda-Comune di Cittiglio and third in Ronde van Vlaanderen, she won the Ronde van Drenthe and took the overall lead of the UCI Women's Road World Cup, a lead which she kept after another second place in La Flèche Wallonne Féminine. Johansson was the second Swedish cyclist to wear the UCI World Cup leader jersey after Susanne Ljungskog.

Post-2009
At the 2012 Summer Olympics she competed in the women's road race finishing 6th and in the women's time trial finishing 14th.

In August 2015, it was announced that Johansson would join  on a two-year deal.

Personal life
On 8 January 2011, she married the former Norwegian cyclist , who is also her personal manager. They live in Zingem, Belgium, and have two children: a son born in April 2018, and a daughter born in April 2020.

Major results
Source:

2005
 1st  Time trial, National Road Championships
2006
 9th Overall Trophée d'Or Féminin
2007
 1st  Time trial, National Road Championships
 2nd GP Stad Roeselare
 4th Overall Trophée d'Or Féminin
 6th Road race, UCI Road World Championships
 9th Overall Holland Ladies Tour
 10th Drentse 8 van Dwingeloo
2008
 National Road Championships
1st  Time trial
2nd Road race
 1st  Overall Trophée d'Or Féminin
1st Stage 5
 2nd  Road race, Olympic Games
 3rd Omloop Het Volk
 4th Road race, UCI Road World Championships
 4th Overall Tour Cycliste Féminin International de l'Ardèche
 6th Overall Thüringen Rundfahrt der Frauen
 7th Trofeo Alfredo Binda-Comune di Cittiglio
 8th Drentse 8 van Dwingeloo
 9th Tour of Flanders for Women
 9th Tour de Berne
 10th GP de Plouay – Bretagne
2009
 1st Ronde van Drenthe
 2nd La Flèche Wallonne Féminine
 2nd Coupe du Monde Cycliste Féminine de Montréal
 2nd Trofeo Alfredo Binda-Comune di Cittiglio
 3rd Time trial, National Road Championships
 3rd Overall Trophée d'Or Féminin
 3rd Tour of Flanders for Women
 3rd Novilon Eurocup Ronde van Drenthe
 3rd Ronde van Gelderland
 3rd Durango-Durango Emakumeen Saria
 3rd Open de Suède Vårgårda
 3rd Holland Hills Classic
 3rd GP de Plouay – Bretagne
 4th Overall Holland Ladies Tour
1st Stage 6
 5th Overall Thüringen Rundfahrt der Frauen
1st Stage 5
 5th GP Stad Roeselare
 5th Tour de Berne
 7th Grand Prix de Dottignies
2010
 National Road Championships
1st  Road race
2nd Time trial
 1st Overall Trophée d'Or Féminin
1st Stage 5
 1st Omloop Het Nieuwsblad
 1st GP Mameranus
 1st Stage 1 Thüringen Rundfahrt der Frauen
 2nd Drentse 8 van Dwingeloo
 2nd Emakumeen Saria
 3rd  Road race, UCI Road World Championships
 3rd Overall Tour de l'Aude Cycliste Féminin
 3rd Trofeo Alfredo Binda-Comune di Cittiglio
 3rd La Flèche Wallonne Féminine
 3rd Open de Suède Vårgårda
 3rd GP de Plouay – Bretagne
 4th Overall Giro della Toscana Int. Femminile – Memorial Michela Fanini
 4th Tour of Flanders for Women
 4th Grand Prix de Dottignies
 4th GP Stad Roeselare
 4th Grand Prix Elsy Jacobs
 5th Overall Iurreta-Emakumeen Bira
 5th Novilon Eurocup Ronde van Drenthe
 6th Overall Holland Ladies Tour
 6th GP Ciudad de Valladolid
 9th Ronde van Gelderland
2011
 National Road Championships
1st  Road race
2nd Time trial
 1st  Overall Thüringen Rundfahrt der Frauen
1st Stage 3
 1st Omloop Het Nieuwsblad
 1st Omloop van het Hageland
 1st Cholet Pays de Loire Dames
 1st Grand Prix de Dottignies
 2nd Overall Iurreta-Emakumeen Bira
1st Stage 3b
 2nd Overall Giro del Trentino Alto Adige-Südtirol
1st Stage 3
 2nd Overall Holland Ladies Tour
 2nd Trofeo Alfredo Binda-Comune di Cittiglio
 2nd La Flèche Wallonne Féminine
 2nd GP Stad Roeselare
 2nd Durango-Durango Emakumeen Saria
 3rd GP Ciudad de Valladolid
 3rd Grand Prix Elsy Jacobs
 3rd Drentse 8 van Dwingeloo
 4th Overall Tour of Chongming Island Stage race
 4th Tour of Flanders for Women
 6th Overall Energiewacht Tour
 7th Overall Giro d'Italia Femminile
 9th Overall Trophée d'Or Féminin
1st Stage 6
 9th Ronde van Drenthe
 9th Gooik–Geraardsbergen–Gooik
 10th Open de Suède Vårgårda
 10th GP de Plouay – Bretagne
2012
 National Road Championships
1st  Road race
1st  Time trial
 1st Overall Tour de Free State
1st Stage 3
 2nd Overall Emakumeen Euskal Bira
 2nd Grand Prix de Dottignies
 2nd Halle-Buizingen
 3rd Overall Thüringen Rundfahrt der Frauen
1st Points classification
 3rd Ronde van Drenthe
 4th Overall Grand Prix Elsy Jacobs
 5th Overall Giro d'Italia Femminile
1st Stage 9
 5th Overall Holland Ladies Tour
 5th Drentse 8 van Dwingeloo
 5th Trofeo Alfredo Binda-Comune di Cittiglio
 5th Gooik–Geraardsbergen–Gooik
 6th Road race, Olympic Games
 6th Classica Citta di Padova
 6th Open de Suède Vårgårda
 7th Durango-Durango Emakumeen Saria
 8th Novilon Euregio Cup
 9th Road race, UCI Road World Championships
 9th La Flèche Wallonne Féminine
 9th GP Stad Roeselare
2013
 1st UCI Women's Road World Rankings
 National Road Championships
1st  Time trial
2nd Road race
 1st  Overall Emakumeen Euskal Bira
1st Stages 2 & 3 (ITT)
 1st  Overall Thüringen Rundfahrt der Frauen
1st  Points classification
1st Stages 1 & 5
 1st Cholet Pays de Loire Dames
 1st Gooik–Geraardsbergen–Gooik
 UCI Road World Championships
2nd  Road race
3rd  Team time trial
10th Time trial
 2nd Overall UCI Women's Road World Cup
 2nd Overall La Route de France
1st Prologue
 2nd Trofeo Alfredo Binda
 2nd Durango-Durango Emakumeen Saria
 2nd Draai van de Kaai
 2nd Open de Suède Vårgårda
 2nd GP de Plouay
 3rd Overall Grand Prix Elsy Jacobs
 3rd Overall Belgium Tour
 3rd Omloop Het Nieuwsblad
 3rd Le Samyn des Dames
 3rd Omloop van het Hageland
 3rd Drentse 8 van Dwingeloo
 3rd Ronde van Drenthe World Cup
 3rd Tour of Flanders
 3rd 7-Dorpenomloop Aalburg
 3rd Open de Suède Vårgårda TTT
 4th Tour of Chongming Island World Cup
 5th Overall Tour of Chongming Island
 5th La Flèche Wallonne Féminine
 6th Overall Ladies Tour of Qatar
 6th Overall Giro del Trentino Alto Adige-Südtirol
 6th Holland Hills Classic
 8th Ronde van Gelderland
2014
 National Road Championships
1st  Road race
1st  Time trial
 1st  National Cyclo-cross Championships
 1st  Overall BeNe Ladies Tour
1st Stage 2a (ITT)
 1st Le Samyn
 1st Cholet Pays de Loire Dames
 1st Trofeo Alfredo Binda-Comune di Cittiglio
 1st Holland Hills Classic
 1st Stage 6 Holland Ladies Tour
 UCI Road World Championships
2nd  Team time trial
3rd  Road race
 2nd Overall UCI Women's Road World Cup
 2nd Overall The Women's Tour
1st Stage 1
 2nd Omloop Het Nieuwsblad
 2nd Omloop van het Hageland
 2nd Gooik–Geraardsbergen–Gooik
 3rd Novilon EDR Cup
 3rd Tour of Flanders
 3rd 7-Dorpenomloop Aalburg
 3rd Durango-Durango Emakumeen Saria
 4th Overall Ladies Tour of Qatar
 5th Overall Holland Ladies Tour
1st Stage 6
 5th Drentse 8 van Dwingeloo
 5th Ronde van Gelderland
 6th Overall Ladies Tour of Norway
 6th Overall Belgium Tour
 6th GP de Plouay
 7th Overall Festival Luxembourgeois du cyclisme féminin Elsy Jacobs
 8th Overall Emakumeen Euskal Bira
 8th Ronde van Drenthe World Cup
 8th La Course by Le Tour de France
 8th Sparkassen Giro
 9th Dwars door de Westhoek
 10th Overall Giro d'Italia Femminile
 10th Open de Suède Vårgårda
2015
 National Road Championships
1st  Road race
1st  Time trial
 1st  Overall Thüringen Rundfahrt der Frauen
 1st  Overall Belgium Tour
 1st Durango-Durango Emakumeen Saria
 2nd Holland Hills Classic
 2nd GP de Plouay
 3rd Overall Emakumeen Euskal Bira
1st  Points classification
1st Stages 2 & 4
 3rd Le Samyn des Dames
 4th Overall The Women's Tour
 4th Marianne Vos Classic
 5th Road race, UCI Road World Championships
 5th Overall Ladies Tour of Qatar
 7th Overall Ladies Tour of Norway
 7th Gooik–Geraardsbergen–Gooik
 7th La Course by Le Tour de France
 8th Ronde van Drenthe World Cup
 8th Crescent Women World Cup Vårgårda
 10th La Flèche Wallonne Féminine
 10th Dwars door de Westhoek
2016
 National Road Championships
1st  Road race
1st  Time trial
 1st  Overall Emakumeen Euskal Bira
1st Points classification
1st Stages 1 & 2
 2nd  Road race, Olympic Games
 2nd Le Samyn des Dames
 2nd Tour of Flanders
 3rd Strade Bianche
 3rd Durango-Durango Emakumeen Saria
 4th Trofeo Alfredo Binda-Comune di Cittiglio
 5th Overall Auensteiner–Radsporttage
1st Mountains classification
 7th Overall Belgium Tour
 7th La Flèche Wallonne Féminine
 8th Road race, UEC European Road Championships
 8th Overall Tour of California
 8th Overall The Women's Tour
 8th Acht van Westerveld
 9th Overall Thüringen Rundfahrt der Frauen
1st Mountains classification
 9th Gent–Wevelgem
 9th Holland Hills Classic

General classification timelines

Classics results timelines

Major championships timelines

References

External links
 
 
 
 
 
 
 
 
 

1983 births
Living people
People from Sollefteå Municipality
Cyclists at the 2008 Summer Olympics
Cyclists at the 2012 Summer Olympics
Cyclists at the 2016 Summer Olympics
Olympic cyclists of Sweden
Olympic silver medalists for Sweden
Swedish female cyclists
Olympic medalists in cycling
Medalists at the 2008 Summer Olympics
Medalists at the 2016 Summer Olympics
Sportspeople from Västernorrland County